Isaac Smith (born 30 December 1988) is an Australian rules football player who plays with the Geelong Football Club in the Australian Football League. Smith started off playing for the Hawthorn Football Club and is a four time premiership player winning the Norm Smith Medal in the 2022 AFL Grand Final.

Early career
Smith was born in Young, New South Wales and moved to Cootamundra where he attended school. As a child he played Australian rules football and basketball with Luke Breust in Temora. Moving to Wagga Wagga when he was 13, Smith played with future Hawthorn teammate Matt Suckling in the Wagga Hawks for several years before both moved to the Wagga Tigers where they won two premierships. Smith then played with Albury in the Ovens & Murray Football League in 2007.

Smith later moved to Victoria to take up a Sports Management Degree at the University of Ballarat. He joined the Redan Football Club and became known for being an effective left-footed kick in the Redan reserves. After winning the 2009 senior Ballarat Football League (BFL) Grand Final, he resisted North Ballarat's overtures to do a pre-season with them, but by midway through 2010, he was not only being pulled again by the Roosters, but pushed from within by Redan.

Smith had a meteoric rise in 2010, starting the year playing with Redan in the BFL and finishing in North Ballarat's Victorian Football League (VFL) premiership side. Smith was also a member of the successful Victorian Country Football League (VCFL) team that won the 2010 Australian Country Football Championships in Canberra.

Smith was Hawthorn's first pick in the 2010 AFL Draft, being selected with pick 19. Smith's path to the AFL was considered unusual, as he had been passed on the draft the previous year and had been considered unlikely to be drafted at the start of 2010.

AFL career

During the 2011 season, Smith drew attention for his reliance on speed rather than strength or size in his playing.

Smith was widely regarded as having a good 2013 season, and was a member of the 2013 Hawthorn premiership side. His performance in the 2013 Grand Final included kicking an outstanding 50m goal in the last quarter.

In the 2016 Qualifying Final match against traditional rivals Geelong, Smith drew attention for missing a relatively simple shot on goal after the siren, the scoring of which would have won Hawthorn the game, and automatically sent them to the preliminary final. Hawthorn would be eliminated from the finals series following a loss in their semi-final match against the Western Bulldogs the following week.

From 2017 to 2019, Smith served as Co-Vice-Captain of the Hawks along with Liam Shiels, but both were replaced in that role prior to the 2019 season by Jack Gunston. Smith remained a member of Hawthorn's leadership group.

In 2022 Smith became the oldest player to win the Norm Smith Medal for best on ground in an AFL grand final during Geelong's grand final win over the Sydney Swans, posting 32 disposals and 12 marks to go along with 3 goals in the 81 point win.

Personal life
Smith completed a Masters of Business Administration at Swinburne University.

Statistics
Updated to the end of the 2022 season.

|- 
| 2011 ||  || 16
| 16 || 20 || 9 || 178 || 123 || 301 || 100 || 40 || 1.3 || 0.6 || 11.1 || 7.7 || 18.8 || 6.3 || 2.5 || 1
|- 
| 2012 ||  || 16
| 22 || 17 || 13 || 222 || 164 || 386 || 95 || 86 || 0.8 || 0.6 || 10.1 || 7.5 || 17.5 || 4.3 || 3.9 || 0
|- 
| style="background:khaki;"| 2013# ||  || 16
| 24 || 18 || 16 || 286 || 193 || 479 || 112 || 82 || 0.8 || 0.7 || 11.9 || 8.0 || 20.0 || 4.7 || 3.4 || 5
|-
| style="background:khaki;"| 2014# ||  || 16
| 24 || 24 || 15 || 337 || 203 || 540 || 133 || 68 || 1.0 || 0.6 || 14.0 || 8.5 || 22.5 || 5.5 || 2.8 || 4
|- 
| style="background:khaki;"| 2015# ||  || 16
| 25 || 23 || 12 || 350 || 231 || 581 || 163 || 70 || 0.9 || 0.6 || 14.0 || 9.2 || 23.2 || 6.5 || 2.8 || 3
|-
| 2016 ||  || 16
| 24 || 9 || 16 || 335 || 206 || 541 || 139 || 66 || 0.4 || 0.7 || 14.0 || 8.6 || 22.5 || 5.8 || 2.8 || 4
|- 
| 2017 ||  || 16
| 22 || 14 || 12 || 313 || 187 || 500 || 130 || 65 || 0.6 || 0.5 || 14.2 || 8.5 || 22.7 || 5.9 || 3.0 || 2
|-
| 2018 ||  || 16
| 24 || 26 || 14 || 311 || 213 || 524 || 143 || 61 || 1.1 || 0.6 || 13.0 || 8.9 || 21.8 || 6.0 || 2.5 || 6
|- 
| 2019 ||  || 16
| 19 || 9 || 8 || 273 || 154 || 427 || 100 || 41 || 0.5 || 0.4 || 14.4 || 8.1 || 22.5 || 5.3 || 2.2 || 0
|-
| 2020 ||  || 16
| 10 || 5 || 2 || 100 || 73 || 173 || 35 || 21 || 0.5 || 0.2 || 10.0 || 7.3 || 17.3 || 3.5 || 2.1 || 3
|-  
| 2021 ||  || 7
| 24 || 15 || 9 || 383 || 167 || 550 || 166 || 38 || 0.6 || 0.4 || 16.0 || 7.0 || 22.9 || 6.9 || 1.6 || 1
|-
| style="background:khaki;"| 2022# ||  || 7
| 24 || 15 || 22 || 339 || 178 || 517 || 161 || 31 || 0.6 || 0.9 || 14.1 || 7.4 || 21.5 || 6.7 || 1.3 || 5
|- class=sortbottom
! colspan=3 | Career
! 258 !! 195 !! 148 !! 3427 !! 2092 !! 5519 !! 1477 !! 669 !! 0.8 !! 0.6 !! 13.3 !! 8.1 !! 21.4 !! 5.7 !! 2.6 || 34
|}

Notes

Honours and achievements
Team
 4 × AFL premiership player: 2013, 2014, 2015.: 2022
 2 × Minor premiership: 2012, 2013
 Minor premiership: 2022

Individual
 Norm Smith Medal: 2022
  vice-captain: 2017–2019
  best clubman: 2016
  most promising player: 2013
 All-Stars team: 2020
  life member

References

External links

1988 births
Living people
Australian rules footballers from New South Wales
Hawthorn Football Club players
Hawthorn Football Club Premiership players
Box Hill Football Club players
North Ballarat Football Club players
Redan Football Club players
People from Young, New South Wales
Federation University Australia alumni
Geelong Football Club players
Four-time VFL/AFL Premiership players
Swinburne University of Technology alumni
Geelong Football Club Premiership players
Sportsmen from New South Wales